The 1874 New York state election was held on November 3, 1874, to elect the governor, the lieutenant governor, a judge of the New York Court of Appeals, a Canal Commissioner and an Inspector of State Prisons, as well as all members of the New York State Assembly and one member of the New York State Senate.

History
The Prohibition state convention met on June 23 at Auburn, New York. James L. Bagg was temporary chairman until the choice of Charles C. Leigh as president. Myron H. Clark was nominated for governor on the first ballot (vote: Clark 81, Horace V. Howland 27, Charles C. Leigh 9). James L. Bagg for lieutenant governor, Horace V. Howland for Judge of the Court of Appeals, Daniel Walford for Canal Commissioner, and Ira Bell for Prison Inspector, were nominated by acclamation.

The Democratic state convention met on September 16 and 17 at Syracuse, New York. Samuel J. Tilden was nominated for governor on the first ballot (vote: Tilden 252, Amasa J. Parker 126, Lucius Robinson 6, J. McQuade 3, George G. Bradley 1). William Dorsheimer was nominated for lieutenant governor on the first ballot (vote: Dorsheimer 193, Smith M. Weed 135, Stephen T. Hayt 34, Edward F. Jones 15, George W. Schuyler 11). Adin Thayer was nominated for Canal Commissioner on the first ballot (vote: Thayer 196, Isaiah Fuller 148, Nathaniel P. Milliman 5). George Wagener was nominated for Prison Inspector during the first ballot when he had 118 votes and George W. Millspaugh 35. Theodore Miller was nominated for Judge of the Court of Appeals on the first ballot (vote: Miller 196, Robert Earl 115).

The Republican state convention met on September 23 at the Opera House in Utica, New York. Theodore M. Pomeroy was temporary chairman until the choice of Ex-Governor Edwin D. Morgan as president. The incumbents Governor John A. Dix, Lieutenant Governor John C. Robinson, Judge Alexander S. Johnson, Canal Commissioner Alexander Barkley and Prison Inspector Thomas Kirkpatrick were re-nominated by acclamation.

The Liberal Republican state convention met on September 29 at Tweddle Hall in Albany, New York. Charles Hughes was president. The convention did not nominate a ticket.

Result
The whole Democratic ticket was elected, defeating all the incumbents.

The seat in the New York State Senate was won by Democrat Albert P. Laning.

75 Democrats and 53 Republicans were elected for the session of 1875 to the New York State Assembly.

See also
New York gubernatorial elections

Notes

Sources
The tickets: THE STATE ELECTION.; CANDIDATES TO BE VOTED FOR TO-DAY in NYT on November 3, 1874
Result for governor, Senate and Assembly: NEW-YORK ELECTIONS.; RESULTS OF THE OFFICIAL CANVASS FOR THE VARIOUS OFFICERS in NYT on November 19, 1874
Results: The Tribune Almanac 1875

1874
1874 New York (state) elections